George Harding may refer to:

George Harding (British Army officer) (1788–1860), British general
George Harding (cricketer) (born 1996), English cricketer
George C. Harding, American architect of Pittsfield, Massachusetts
George Frederick Harding (1858–1927), British rugby player
George M. Harding (1827–1910), American architect of Portland, Maine
George Matthews Harding (1882–1959), war artist, trained as an architect
George Perfect Harding (died 1853), English portrait-painter and copyist
George Rogers Harding (1838–1895), Queensland judge and the founder of St John's Wood, Brisbane
George Tryon Harding (1843–1928), American physician, father of Warren G. Harding

See also
 Georg Harding (born 1981), Austrian footballer
 George Hardinge (1743–1816), English judge
 George Nicholas Hardinge (1781–1808), Royal Navy officer